Parnassius schultei  is a high-altitude butterfly which is found in Tibet and west China.
It is a member of the snow Apollo genus (Parnassius) of the swallowtail family (Papilionidae).

References

Weiss, J.-C. 1992. The Parnassiinae of the World, Part 2. Sciences Nat, Venette; 87 pp.
Chou, I. (ed) 1994. Monographia Rhopalocerorum Sinensium (Monograph of Chinese Butterflies). Henan Scientific and Technological Publishing House, Zhengzhou.(in Chinese)

External links
Parnassius of the World - photos and range map

Further reading
sv:Parnassius schultei - Swedish Wikipedia provides further references and synonymy

schultei
Butterflies described in 1989